Invincible Tiger: The Legend of Han Tao is a hand-to-hand action video game developed by Blitz Arcade and published by Namco Bandai Games for the PlayStation 3 and Xbox 360. The game tells the story of Han Tao, the General of a Thousand Victories, who attempts to rescue the Star of Destiny from the foul clutches of the Evil Overlord. As Han Tao, players must fight their way through the Evil Overlord's throngs, using a number of hyperbolic hand-to-hand combat techniques, ancient weapons, and Zen-powered attacks. It was released on August 26, 2009. The game was removed from all digital stores in 2013.

Gameplay
Invincible Tiger: The Legend of Han Tao will feature basic beat 'em up and hand-to-hand action elements with a basic interface and easy to learn, pick-up-and-play controls. Invincible Tiger features a number of different modes for single- and multiplayer action. Gamers can play through the game's storyline in co-op mode, which is available both locally and online. The game also includes an Endurance Mode, in which players are tasked with surviving an unending onslaught of foes for a specified amount of time.

The game provides both an anaglyph mode and several stereoscopic modes for 3D viewing while playing the game. While the anaglyph mode will work on any TV, use of the stereoscopic modes requires the player to have a 3D ready TV.

Reception

Invincible Tiger: The Legend of Han Tao received mixed reviews from critics. On Metacritic, the game received a score of 57/100 for the PlayStation 3 version based on 8 reviews and 61/100 for the Xbox 360 version based on 14 reviews, both indicating "mixed or average reviews".

See also
List of stereoscopic video games

References

External links
 Invincible Tiger: The Legend of Han Tao at IGN

2009 video games
Beat 'em ups
Bandai Namco games
Video games about ninja
PlayStation 3 games
PlayStation Network games
Side-scrolling video games
Video games developed in the United Kingdom
Video games with cel-shaded animation
Video games with 2.5D graphics
Video games with stereoscopic 3D graphics
Wuxia video games
Xbox 360 Live Arcade games
Blitz Games Studios games
Multiplayer and single-player video games